Vyselki is a rural locality (a stanitsa) and the administrative center of Vyselkovsky District of Krasnodar Krai, Russia. Population: 18,746 (2020),

References

Rural localities in Krasnodar Krai